Coquette Point is a coastal locality in the Cassowary Coast Region, Queensland, Australia.

Geography 
Barneys Point is the most north-westerly part of the locality where the Johnstone River turns east towards the Coral Sea.

References 

Cassowary Coast Region
Coastline of Queensland
Localities in Queensland